Wing Commander Kenneth Horatio Wallis  (26 April 1916 – 1 September 2013) was a British aviator, engineer, and inventor. During the Second World War, Wallis served in the Royal Air Force and flew 28 bomber missions over Germany; after the war, he moved on to research and development, before retiring in 1964. He later became one of the leading exponents of autogyros and earned 34 world records, still holding eight of them at the time of his death in 2013.

Early life
Born on 26 April 1916 at Ely, he was educated at The Kings' School Ely Cambridgeshire. Wallis developed a practical interest in mechanics, building a motorcycle at the age of 11. In 1936, he was inspired by a demonstration by Henri Mignet of his Mignet HM.14 Pou-du-Ciel ("Flying Flea"). Using only Mignet's book, Wallis gathered the materials required, and started to build his own Flying Flea. He abandoned construction because of widespread adverse publicity about fatal accidents that implied inadequate design of the type.

Military career
Wallis applied for the RAF's Volunteer Reserve Service but was turned away because of an issue with his right eye. Consequently, he obtained a private flying licence, which required only a certificate signed by his GP. In 1938, Wallis again tried to join the RAF, but failed the eye test. He applied again in 1939 and finally passed the eye test, explaining, "I did the first line with my good eye then they covered it up and asked me to read the bottom line with my bad eye, without them realising I just turned my head slightly so I could again see with my good eye—I passed it with Above Average Eye Sight!"

Wallis's military career started with Westland Lysander patrols in the RAF. In 1942, he was transferred to RAF Bomber Command, flying Wellingtons near Grimsby. Wallis subsequently served in Italy and on secondment to the United States Strategic Air Command, where he flew the massive Convair B-36, which had six piston engines and four auxiliary jet engines. Thereafter, he was involved in research and development, and was awarded a number of patents on his inventions. Wallis left the RAF in 1964, retiring to Norfolk.

Autogyros
Wallis who lived at Reymerston Hall, Norfolk produced autogyros for, in his own words, "reconnaissance, research and development, surveillance and military purposes", and his designs were not available for enthusiasts as he considered that although the design is simple, it has to be built to the appropriate standards. His contribution to autogyro design included the "offset gimbal rotor head".

Wallis had the help of Beagle Aircraft in building five Wallis WA-116 autogyros at Shoreham in 1962 for evaluation by the British Army. This collaboration ended when the British Army chose the Westland Sioux for this role.

Wallis worked as Sean Connery's stunt pilot in the 1967 James Bond film You Only Live Twice, where he flew one of his WA-116s named Little Nellie.

In 1970 it was announced that Airmark would produce his autogyro design with a certificate of airworthiness, that being essential for commercial use of the autogyro. Expected price was around £3,000.

Between 2006 and 2009, Wallis took part in filming for Into the Wind, a documentary by Steven Hatton featuring the experiences and memories of wartime members of Bomber Command. The film, released in 2012, features Wallis demonstrating several of his autogyro designs.

Wallis was the President of the Norfolk and Suffolk Aviation Museum, and Patron of the Wolf Preservation Foundation.

Autogyros and aircraft
Wallbro Monoplane Replica
Wallis WA-116 Agile
Wallis WA-117
Wallis WA-118 Meteorite
Wallis WA-119
Wallis WA-120
Wallis WA-121
Wallis WA-122

Recognition
Wallis was the recognized world record holder for many categories of autogyro records over the years, and was also recognized as the oldest pilot to set a world flight record at the age of 89. Wallis held most of the autogyro world records during his autogyro flying career. On 16 November 2002, Wallis increased the speed record to 207.7 km/h (129.1 mph).

Wallis appeared as himself on an episode of Tell The Truth dated 9 November 1984, discussing his autogyro record.

Wallis received the MBE in 1996.

In July 2013, Wallis received a campaign medal for his 28 bomber missions over Germany during World War II.

Later life
He was married to Peggy Stapley, a Women's Auxiliary Air Force veteran, from 1942 to her death in 2003. Wallis died on 1 September 2013, aged 97. Prior to his death, he was living in the quiet Norfolk village of Reymerston.

Old Buckenham Airport held a memorial event on 29 September 2013 at the request of the Wallis family: "A Celebration of the Life of Wing Commander Ken Wallis". It had been expected that about 500 people would attend, but an estimated 3,000 to 4,000 attended the event.

See also
 Little Nellie 007

References
Notes

Bibliography

 Barkham, Patrick. "That magnificent man in his flying machine." The Guardian, 10 August 2010.
 Hancock, Ian. The Lives of Ken Wallis: Engineer and Aviator Extraordinaire.  London: Ian Hancock, Fifth edition 2010. .
 "War veteran reaches for the skies." BBC News, 14 December 2000.

External links
 www.kenwallisautogyro.com — Official site
  Ken Wallis on aero360 — Interactive 360 Degree image of Ken with his autogyro collection
 "You only live once" — short video

1916 births
2013 deaths
People from Ely, Cambridgeshire
English aviators
Royal Air Force officers
British World War II pilots
British World War II bomber pilots
Members of the Order of the British Empire
Segrave Trophy recipients
Fellows of the Royal Aeronautical Society
British aviation record holders
English inventors